USS Passaic (YN-113/AN-87) was a  built for the United States Navy during World War II. She was commissioned in March 1945 and spent her entire career in the Pacific Ocean. She was decommissioned in March 1947 and placed in reserve. She was sold to the Dominican Republic in September 1976, as patrol vessel Calderas (P209). , Calderas remained active in the Dominican Navy.

Construction 
Passaic, the second U.S. Navy ship to be so named, was originally authorized as YN–113; redesignated AN–87 on 17 January 1944; laid down at Leathem D. Smith Shipbuilding Company, Sturgeon Bay, Wisconsin, 25 April 1944; launched 29 June 1944; sponsored by Mrs. Sam H. North; and commissioned 6 March 1945.

Service history 
During the final months of World War II, Passaic was assigned to the U.S. Pacific Fleet and rendered valuable supporting action, maintaining and recovering antisubmarine nets in Pacific waters.

After war-time service, Passaic remained at Pearl Harbor, Hawaii, until 1947, when she reported to San Diego, California. Decommissioning in March, she remained in reserve there until July 1963. She was then transferred to the U.S. Maritime Administration, and laid up at Suisun Bay with the National Defense Reserve Fleet. Passaconaway was transferred to the Dominican Republic in September 1976 as patrol vessel Calderas (P209). , the ship remained in active service with the Dominican Navy.

Notes

References 
 
 NavSource Online: YN-113 / AN-87 Passaic

 

Cohoes-class net laying ships
Ships built in Sturgeon Bay, Wisconsin
1944 ships
World War II net laying ships of the United States
Cohoes-class net laying ships of the Dominican Navy
Patrol vessels of the Dominican Republic